The coat of arms of Havana, Cuba, consist of three castles that represent the three first main castles which defended the city—namely, the Fuerza Castle, the Morro Castle and the Punta Castle.

Description
The key represents that Havana was the gateway to the New World of Spanish America.  The shield is supported by an oak branch on one side and a laurel wreath on the other. The oak branch symbolizes the strength of the nation; and the laurel wreath: honour and glory. These symbols were meant to represent the rights of man: Equality, Liberty and Fraternity.

Gallery

See also
 Coat of arms of Cuba
 Flag of Cuba

References

External links

 Coats of arms and flags of Cuba

Culture in Havana
History of Havana
Havana
Havana
Havana
Havana